The Kapok Flag is the  flag used by the Cantonese nationalist movement and represents the Cantonese people of southern China, as well as their language and culture.

Design and symbolism 

The flag consists of three horizontal stripes and a stylized image of a Kapok flower in the center. Bombax ceiba is literally known as “cotton-tree flowers” in Cantonese. It is the official flower of Guangzhou, the capital of Guangdong Province. The use of flowers as national symbols is popular in the East Asia region (Japanese Chrysanthemum Flower, South Korean Rose of Sharon, Chinese plum blossom and Manchurian Orchidaceae). Green represents freedom, peace and vitality. Brown represents the culture of the canton. Blue represents democracy and the ocean.

History 

The origin and authorship of the flag is uncertain, but has been around since around 2008 or even earlier.

In recent years, it can be seen during demonstrations by the Chinese opposition.

See also 
 Flag of Hong Kong
 Flag of Macau
 Kokbayraq
 Flag of Tibet
 Black Bauhinia flag

References 

Flags of China
Unofficial flags 
Flags of indigenous peoples